The Ireland–Claisen rearrangement is a chemical reaction of an allylic ester with strong base to give an γ,δ-unsaturated carboxylic acid.

Several reviews have been published.

Mechanism
The Ireland–Claisen rearrangement is a type of Claisen rearrangement. The mechanism is therefore a concerted [3,3]-sigmatropic rearrangement which according to the Woodward–Hoffmann rules show a concerted, suprafacial, pericyclic reaction pathway.

See also
Cope rearrangement
Overman rearrangement

References

Rearrangement reactions
Name reactions